Badminton at the 2013 East Asian Games was held in Tianjin, China in the month of October. Participant countries included China, Chinese Taipei, Hong Kong, Japan, North Korea, South Korea, Macau, Mongolia and Independent Olympic Athletes. Competitions for five individual disciplines as well as for Men's and Women's team competitions were conducted. China dominated by winning six out of seven possible gold medals while Chinese Taipei won a gold medal in Men's doubles event.

Medal summary

Medal table

Medalists

Results

Men's singles

Women's singles

Men's doubles

Women's doubles

Mixed doubles

References 

Badminton at the East Asian Games
2013 in badminton
2013 in Chinese sport
Badminton in China
International sports competitions hosted by China